New Europe may refer to:

Entertainment
 Michael Palin's New Europe, a travel documentary presented by Michael Palin
 New Europe (book), the book that Michael Palin wrote to accompany the series
 New Europe Film Sales, a Polish independent film distributor
 Film New Europe Association
 New European Ensemble, classical music group
 New European Painting, emerged in the 1980s

Periodicals
 The New Europe, defunct British magazine
 Business New Europe, a magazine
 Finance New Europe, a magazine and website in Prague, Czech Republic
 A10 – new European architecture, an architectural magazine

Other
 A8 countries, central and eastern European countries that joined the EU in 2004
 New Europe Bridge, between the cities of Vidin, Bulgaria and Calafat, Romania
 New European Driving Cycle, to assess car emissions and fuel economy
 New European Order, a neo-fascist alliance set up in 1951
 New European Transmission System, a project to unite Central and South Eastern Europe's natural gas transmission networks
 Newropeans, a European political party

See also 
 Europe (disambiguation)
 New European (disambiguation)
 Nouvelle Europe, a Paris-based organization founded in 2003
 Old Europe (disambiguation)